The 1993 Individual Speedway Junior World Championship was the 17th edition of the World motorcycle speedway Under-21 Championships. The event was won by Joe Screen of England.

World final
August 15, 1993
 Pardubice, Svítkov Stadion

References

1993
World Individual U-21
Speedway competitions in the Czech Republic
1993 in Czech sport